Hypsiglena slevini, the Baja California night snake, is a species of snake in the family Colubridae.  The species is native to Mexico.

References

Hypsiglena
Reptiles of Mexico
Endemic fauna of Mexico
Taxa named by Wilmer W. Tanner
Reptiles described in 1943